The 1974 United States Senate election in Indiana took place on November 5, 1974. Incumbent Democratic U.S. Senator Birch Bayh was re-elected to a third consecutive term in office, defeating Mayor of Indianapolis Richard Lugar.

General election

Candidates
Birch Bayh, incumbent U.S. Senator since 1963
Don L. Lee
Richard Lugar, Mayor of Indianapolis since 1968

Results

See also 
 1974 United States Senate elections

References

1974
Indiana
United States Senate